77th Regiment of Foot may refer to:
77th Regiment of Foot (Montgomerie's Highlanders) (1758–1763)
77th Regiment of Foot (Atholl Highlanders) (1777–1783)
77th (East Middlesex) Regiment of Foot (1787–1881)